The Sarvepalli Radhakrishnan University (SRK University) is a multidisciplinary university in Bhopal, Madhya Pradesh, India.

The university was established in 1995 under the flagship of RKDF Group of Professional institutes.

List of colleges
 R.K.D.F. Institute of Science and Technology
 R.K.D.F. Institute of Science and Technology- M.C.A.
 R.K.D.F. College of Pharmacy
 R.K.D.F. Polytechnic (Pharmacy)
 R.K.D.F. Institute of Management
 R.K.D.F. Institute of Business Management
 R.K.D.F. Homeopathy Medical College Hospital & Research Centre
 R.K.D.F. College of Nursing
 R.K.D.F. Dental College & Research Centre
 R.K.D.F. Medical College Hospital & Research Centre
 Agriculture college
 Paramedical college
 Hospital Management college
 Allied course college

Programs

Under-graduate programs
 Bachelor Of Engineering (B.E.)
 Computer Science & Engineering 
 Information Technology
 Civil Engineering
 Electronic Communication Engineering
 Electrical & Electronics Engineering
 Electronic Instrument
 Electronic Engineering
 Electrical Engineering
 Mechanical Engineering
 Bachelor Of Pharmacy (B. Pharma)
 B. Sc (Nursing)
 GNM (Nursing)
 BDS
 Bachelor of Medicine, Bachelor of surgery (MBBS)
 Bachelor of Homeopathic Medical and surgery (BHMS)
 Bachelor of Business Administration (BBA)
 Bachelor Of Hospital Management (BHM)
 Bachelor of Science (B. Sc)
 Medical Laboratory Technology
 Operation Theatre Technology 
 Cardiac Care Technology
 Perfusion Technology
 Neuro Science Technology 
 Renal Dialysis Technology 
 Respiratory Care Technology
 Anaesthesia Technology 
 Radiotherapy Technology 
 Imaging Technology
 Agriculture
 Math
 Biology
 Computer Science
 Information Technology

Post-graduate programs
 Master of Technology (M.Tech)
 Computer Science & Engineering
 Information Technology
 Software Engineering
 Digital Communication Engineering 
 Power Electronics Engineering
 VLSI
 Microwave Engineering
 Thermal Engineering
 Structure Engineering
 Post Graduate diploma in Management (PGDM)
 Master of Business administration (MBA)
 MBA IN HR- MBA Human Resource
 MBA IN FINANCE
 MBA in HA – MBA Hospital Administration
 MBA in PH- MBA Public Health
 Master in Computer Application (MCA)
 M. Pharma
 Pharmaceutics
 Pharmacology
 Pharma Chemistry
 Pharmacognosy
 M.Sc Nursing
 Obstetrics & Gynaecological Nursing
 Psychiatric Nursing
 Community Health Nursing
 Medical Surgical Nursing
 Pediatric Nursing
 MDS
 Paedodontics & Preventive Dentistry 
 Qthodontics & Dentofacial Orthopedics
 Periodontology
 Oral Medicine & Radiology
 Pathology & Microbiology
 Prosthodontics & Crown & Bridge 
 Conservative Dentistry & Endodontic
 M.D. in Homeopathy
 MD homeopath
 Materia medica
 Pharmacy
 Organon of medicine
 Repertory
 Pediatrics
 Psychiatry
 Practice of medicine
 Master of Science (M. Sc)
 Computer Science
 Information Technology
 Math
 Physics
 Chemistry
 Botany
 Zoology

Diploma courses
 Diploma Polytechnic
 Diploma Polytechnic in Mechanical Engineering. 
 Diploma Polytechnic in Civil Engineering.
 Diploma of Pharmacy (D. Pharma)
 Diploma in General Nursing & Midwifery (GNM)
 Diploma in Post Basic B.Sc. (Nursing)

Doctoral courses PhD programs
Doctor of Philosophy
 Civil Engineering
 Mechanical Engineering
 Computer Organization and Architecture
 Electrical Engineering
 Electrical and Electronics Engineering
 Pharmacy
 Nursing
 Management
 Mathematics
 Physics
 Chemistry

References

External links
 

Universities in Bhopal